Sigvart is a given name. Notable people with the given name include:

Sigvart Dagsland (born 1963), Norwegian singer, pianist, and composer
Sigvart Grini (1870–1944), Norwegian politician
Sigvart Høgh-Nilsen (1880–?), Norwegian pianist and composer
Sigvart Johansen (1881–1964), Norwegian rifle shooter
Sigvart Werner (1872–1959), Danish amateur photographer